Hazel Green may refer to:

 Hazel Green, Alabama
 Hazel Green High School
 Hazel Green, Kentucky
 Hazel Green, Wisconsin
 Hazel Green (town), Wisconsin
 Hazel Green Township, Delaware County, Iowa